The František Palacký Monument is an outdoor monument commemorating František Palacký by Stanislav Sucharda, installed in New Town, Prague, Czech Republic.

External links

 

Monuments and memorials in Prague
Outdoor sculptures in Prague
Sculptures of men in Prague
Statues in Prague